Irek Boguslavsky (born September 09, 1967, Kazan, Tatarstan) is a Russian political figure, deputy of the 5th, 6th, 7th and 8th State Dumas.

In 1991  Boguslavsky graduated from the Kazan State Finance and Economics Institute. From 1999 to 2005, he was engaged in various businesses, including selling cars and tailoring. Also, he was one of the founders of the Real Trans Hair clinic that specializes in hair transplantation.  Boguslavsky started his political career in 2007 when he was elected deputy of 5th State Duma. Later he was re-elected for the 6th (2011-2016), 7th (2016-2021), and 8th State Dumas (since 2021). According to Istories.media, as of July 2021, throughout these 14 years, Irek Boguslavsky has not said a word during the public discussions in the State Duma.

He is one of the members of the State Duma the United States Treasury sanctioned on 24 March 2022 in response to the 2022 Russian invasion of Ukraine.

Awards 
 Order "For Merit to the Fatherland"
 Medal "In Commemoration of the 1000th Anniversary of Kazan"

References

1967 births
Living people
United Russia politicians
21st-century Russian politicians
Eighth convocation members of the State Duma (Russian Federation)
Russian individuals subject to the U.S. Department of the Treasury sanctions